A drop registrar is a domain name registrar who registers expiring Internet domain names immediately after they expire and are deleted by the domain name registry.  A drop registrar will typically use automated software to send up to 250 simultaneous domain name registration requests in an attempt to register the domain name first. In recognition of the potential abuse of such a "domain land rush", ICANN and VeriSign limited the number of  simultaneous requests to 250 since July 17, 2001.  

Drop registrars usually work for a domain back-order service, and receive a percentage of the final auction price.

See also 
Domain drop catching

References 

Domain Name System
Domain name registrars